Culine is a village in Serbia. It is situated in the Mali Zvornik municipality, in the Mačva District of Central Serbia. The village has a Serb ethnic majority and its population was 389 in 2002.

Historical population

1948: 688
1953: 711
1961: 544
1971: 516
1981: 495
1991: 429
2002: 389

References

See also
List of places in Serbia

Populated places in Mačva District